Polignac is a commune in the Haute-Loire department in south-central France,

Population

Sights
The town is dominated by the Forteresse de Polignac with its square donjon tower, 32 m tall. The Chateau de Lavoute Polignac is a few miles away, close to the village of Lavoute.

Art and Literature
The poetical illustration "The Church at Polignac" by Letitia Elizabeth Landon to a painting by James Duffield Harding was written during the imprisonment of Prince Polignac and his colleagues, after the French Revolution of 1830 (in Fisher's Drawing Room Scrap Book, 1837).

See also

Communes of the Haute-Loire department

References

Communes of Haute-Loire